The Duke of Wellington (1769–1852) was a British general who fought in the Napoleonic Wars and defeated Napoleon at Waterloo.

Duke of Wellington may also refer to:
 Duke of Wellington (title), a British peerage hereditary title

Buildings
 The Duke of Wellington, Marylebone, a pub in London, UK
 Duke of Wellington, Belgravia, a pub in London, UK
 Duke of Wellington, Bethnal Green, a former pub in London, UK
 Duke of Wellington Hotel, Melbourne, a hotel in Victoria, Australia

Military
 HMS Duke of Wellington (1852), a 131-gun first-rate ship of the line of the Royal Navy
 TSS Duke of York (1935), a steamer renamed Duke of Wellington
 Duke of Wellington's Regiment, a former British Army regiment

Other uses
 Portrait of the Duke of Wellington or Duke of Wellington

See also
 Arthur Wellesley (disambiguation)
 Duke (disambiguation)
 Iron Duke (disambiguation)
 List of monuments to Arthur Wellesley, 1st Duke of Wellington, including many named "Duke of Wellington"
 Wellington (disambiguation)